Royal Air Force Langham or more simply RAF Langham is a former Royal Air Force station, located at Langham,  northwest of Norwich in the English county of Norfolk. It operated between 1940 and 1961. The airfield was the most northerly of the wartime RAF airfields in Norfolk and its position, just  from the North Sea at Blakeney, made it a suitable site for RAF Coastal Command aircraft.

The airfield was built during the first few months of the Second World War as a dispersal and satellite station to RAF Bircham Newton. It became operational in the summer of 1940.

History
The airfield was originally laid out with three grass runways. The station became fully self-supporting in 1942, when it was upgraded with three concrete runways (tar-covered), three T2 type and four Blister hangars, an encircling perimeter track and 36 spectacle-shape hardstandings, plus a Type 12779/41 control tower and normal Mk 2 approach lighting for night operations.

Primarily used by RAF Coastal Command throughout the war, it was placed on Care and Maintenance in 1947, but reactivated during the Korean War. It was later used as an emergency landing strip for RAF Sculthorpe, before final closure in 1961.

Based units
The following units were based at Langham:

Notable operations and events 

On 2 October 1944 six Bristol Beaufighter of Coastal Command took off from Langham to carry out a night patrol along the Frisian Islands off the coast of the Netherlands. Their task was to randomly attack any enemy shipping encountered there. One of the aircraft (NT 909) was piloted by New Zealander Warrant Officer Douglas Mann with English navigator Flight Sergeant Donald Kennedy. Close to the island of Borkum the plane attacked a convoy, but in poor visibility struck an unknown obstacle causing Mann to lose control. The convoy's escort opened fire on the stricken plane shooting it down and, after some difficulty, Mann and Kennedy took to their rescue dinghy.

After several abortive rescue attempts the airmen were finally rescued by High Speed Launch 2679, stationed at Gorleston-on-Sea, on 10 October after being in the sea for eight days. Both men suffered from acute hypothermia and immersion foot. They were taken to Great Yarmouth Naval Hospital, eventually making a full recovery. Mann returned to 489 Squadron and was awarded the Distinguished Flying Cross.

Current use

The station was purchased by Bernard Matthews Ltd, who constructed turkey sheds on the runways. This has preserved large sections of the runways.

A small aircraft repair and maintenance facility is based in buildings to the south side of the airfield, and uses the southern perimeter track and adjacent grass area for flying operations.

Surviving buildings on the site include the control tower and a dome trainer building used for the instruction of ground-to-air anti-aircraft gunnery. Langham Dome, which sits on the edge of the former base, is one of only six remaining training domes in the United Kingdom and was built in 1942. Film of enemy planes was projected onto its walls for target practice. The structure has been restored and a museum installed following grants from English Heritage and the Heritage Lottery Fund. On 17 May 2015 a documentary about the dome, entitled The Dome: A Secret of World War II, narrated by Stephen Fry, was broadcast by BBC One.

See also
List of former Royal Air Force stations

References

Citations

Bibliography

External links

Bircham Newton Memorial Project
Langham Dome website

Royal Air Force stations in Norfolk
Royal Air Force stations of World War II in the United Kingdom